Osteobrama bakeri is a species of ray-finned fish in the genus Osteobrama. It is endemic to streams in the southern Western Ghats of Kerala where it has been recorded from the rivers Chaliyar ; Periyar,  Chalakudy, Karuvannur, Muvattupuzha, Meenachil, Manimala, Chandragiri, Bharathapuzha, Pamba, Kallada and Achenkovil.

Footnotes 

 

Bakeri
Fish described in 1873